Edinburg Historic District is a national historic district located at Edinburg, Shenandoah County, Virginia. The district encompasses 292 contributing buildings, 6 contributing sites, 3 contributing structures, and 3 contributing objects in the town of Edinburg.  It includes a variety of commercial, residential, and institutional buildings dating primarily from the time of its incorporation in 1852 to the mid-20th century. They are in a variety of popular architectural styles including Colonial Revival, Italianate, and Queen Anne.  Notable buildings include the Philip Grandstaff House (1787), Edinburg Hotel, St. John's United Methodist Church (1916), Edinburg High School (1932-1933), Rush House, The Hatch, Piccadilly House (1850), Pres Grandstaff House, Masonic Building (1879), Harshman House (1900), Rest Haven Inn, Edinburg Train Station, Edinburg Village Shops (1896), Wrenn Building (c. 1900), Edinburg Town Hall (1903), St. Paul's United Church of Christ (1911), and the Mantz House (1930).  Located in the district is the separately listed Edinburg Mill.

It was listed on the National Register of Historic Places in 1998.

References

Historic districts in Shenandoah County, Virginia
Italianate architecture in Virginia
Queen Anne architecture in Virginia
Colonial Revival architecture in Virginia
National Register of Historic Places in Shenandoah County, Virginia
Historic districts on the National Register of Historic Places in Virginia